Falnash is a village in the Scottish Borders of Scotland. It is near Teviothead, in the former Roxburghshire, and in the parish of Teviothead.

There was a chapel in Falnash, but no structural remains can be seen.

See also
List of places in the Scottish Borders
List of places in Scotland

External links
CANMORE/RCAHMS record of Falnash Chapel
RCAHMS record of Falnash Burn
Old Roads of Scotland: Teviotdale

References

Villages in the Scottish Borders